Mężenin may refer to the following places:
Mężenin, Masovian Voivodeship (east-central Poland)
Mężenin, Łomża County in Podlaskie Voivodeship (north-east Poland)
Mężenin, Zambrów County in Podlaskie Voivodeship (north-east Poland)